<onlyinclude>

January 2023

See also

Notes

References

killings by law enforcement officers
 01